The Diocese of Óbidos is a Roman Catholic diocese located in the city of Óbidos. It was a suffragan of the Ecclesiastical province of Belém do Pará in Brazil until 6 November 2019 when it became a suffragan of the Archdiocese of Santarém.

History
 On 10 April 1957, the Territorial Prelature of Óbidos was created from the Territorial Prelature of Santarém
 On 9 November 2011, the Territorial Prelature was elevated to a diocese

Leadership
 Bishops of Óbidos
 Bishop Bernardo Johannes Bahlmann, O.F.M. (9 November 2011 – present)
 Prelates of Óbidos
 Bishop Bernardo Johannes Bahlmann, O.F.M. (28 January 2009 - 9 November 2011)
 Bishop Martinho Lammers, O.F.M. (19 July 1976 – 28 January 2009)
 Bishop Constantino José Lüers, O.F.M. (13 April 1973 – 24 March 1976), appointed Bishop of Penedo, Alagoas 
 Bishop João Floriano Loewenau, O.F.M. (12 September 1957 - 1972)

References

External links
 GCatholic.org
 Catholic Hierarchy

Roman Catholic dioceses in Brazil
Christian organizations established in 1957
Roman Catholic dioceses and prelatures established in the 20th century